Deineches hackeri is a species of hoverfly in the family Syrphidae. It is endemic to Australia.

References

Eristalinae
Insects described in 1926
Diptera of Australasia